Sheffield Neepsend was a short-lived Parliamentary constituency in the City of Sheffield, England. The constituency was created in 1950 and abolished in 1955, presumably due to its low number of electors - never exceeding 50,000.  It was one of the safest Labour Party seats, and this was why its first MP, Harry Morris, agreed to step down in order that Government Minister Frank Soskice could gain a seat in the Commons in the 1950 by-election.

Boundaries 
The County Borough of Sheffield wards of Burngreave, Neepsend, St Peter's, and St Phillip's.

Members of Parliament

Election results

Sources

Richard Kimber's Political Science Resources  (1951 election results)
British Parliamentary By Elections
Sheffield General Election Results 1945 - 2001, Sheffield City Council

References

Neepsend
Constituencies of the Parliament of the United Kingdom established in 1950
Constituencies of the Parliament of the United Kingdom disestablished in 1955